Santa Maria della Salute is a church in Venice, Italy.

Santa Maria della Salute  may also refer to:

 Santa Maria della Salute (film), a Serbian film 
 Santa Maria della Salute a Primavalle, a church in Rome, Italy